Peter Gilbert (September 6, 1867 – January 1, 1911) was a third baseman in Major League Baseball who played from 1890 to 1894.

External links
 Baseball Reference

19th-century baseball players
Baltimore Orioles (AA) players
Baltimore Orioles (NL) players
Brooklyn Grooms players
Louisville Colonels players
Major League Baseball third basemen
Baseball players from Connecticut
1867 births
1912 deaths
Newark Little Giants players
Troy Trojans (minor league) players
Springfield Ponies players
Buffalo Bisons (minor league) players
Springfield Maroons players